Luke Gibleon is an American sound editor and re-recording mixer. He has won four Motion Picture Sound Editors Awards.

Early life
Luke was born in Waterloo, Iowa. He graduated with a BM from the Berklee College of Music in 2007.

Selected filmography

 2022 – The Bob's Burgers Movie
 2022 – Bullet Train
 2021 – The Underground Railroad
 2021 – Chaos Walking
 2020 – Greyhound
 2020 – Birds of Prey

 2019 – El Camino: A Breaking Bad Movie
 2019 – Togo
 2019 – John Wick: Chapter 3 – Parabellum
 2019 – Hobbs & Shaw
 2017 – Twin Peaks

Awards and nominations

References

External links
 

American sound editors
Re-recording mixers
Living people
Year of birth missing (living people)